Sudhangshu Seal (Shudhangshu Shil; born 27 March 1945) was a member of the 14th Lok Sabha of India. He represented the Kolkata North West constituency of West Bengal and is a member of the Communist Party of India (Marxist) (CPI(M)) political party.

Currently, he is the councillor of ward no. 20 of Kolkata Municipal Corporation. In the K.M.C election 2010, he was chosen as the Left Front's mayoral candidate. After the Left Front lost the election to the Trinamool Congress, the CPI(M) leadership denied him the post of the Leader of the Opposition and former CPI(M) MLA and councillor Rupa Bagchi took office as the leader of the opposition.

External links

 Biography from Lok Sabha database

Living people
1945 births
Communist Party of India (Marxist) politicians from West Bengal
Politicians from Kolkata
India MPs 2004–2009
University of Calcutta alumni
Lok Sabha members from West Bengal
West Bengal municipal councillors